Callopistria is a genus of moths of the family Noctuidae. It was described by Jacob Hübner in 1821.

Description
Their eyes are naked and without lashes. Its proboscis is well developed. The palpi are short, upturned, obliquely porrect (extending forward), roughly scaled and reaching above vertex of head. Antennae bipectinated (comb like on both sides). Thorax hairy, without tufts. Abdomen with dorsal tufts on the proximal segments. Male with large lateral and anal tufts. Tibia spineless and strongly tufted. Forewings short and broad with non-crenulate (non-scalloped) cilia. Apex rounded, inner margin lobed near base and with a slight tooth of scales at outer angle. Hindwings of male with a ridge and fold on underside running from center of costa to lower angle of cell and then to centre of outer margin.

Species
 Callopistria aetiohiops Butler, 1878 (or Callopistria aethiops)
 Callopistria albipunctalis Holloway, 1989
 Callopistria albistriga (Walker, [1863])
 Callopistria albistrigoides Poole, 1989
 Callopistria albivitta (Hampson, 1918)
 Callopistria albolinea (Graeser. 1889)
 Callopistria albomacula Leech, 1900
 Callopistria alfredi Holloway, 1989
 Callopistria altigutta (Holloway, 1989)
 Callopistria antithetica Wiltshire, 1977
 Callopistria apicalis (Walker, 1855)
 Callopistria argyrosemastis (Hampson, 1918)
 Callopistria argyrosticta (Butler, 1881)
 Callopistria batanga (Draudt, 1930)
 Callopistria benguellae Weymer, 1908
 Callopistria bergeri Berio, 1976
 Callopistria bernei Viette, 1985
 Callopistria cariei (de Joannis, 1915)
 Callopistria chera (A. E. Prout, 1927)
 Callopistria chloriza (Guenée, 1852)
 Callopistria chlorocroa (Hampson, 1908)
 Callopistria clava (Leech, 1900)
 Callopistria coelisigna Hampson, 1902
 Callopistria complicata (Holland, 1894)
 Callopistria concinna (Prout, 1926)
 Callopistria cordata (Ljungh, 1825)
 Callopistria cornuscopiae (Holland, 1894)
 Callopistria cristata Legrand, 1966
 Callopistria cyanopera (Hampson, 1911)
 Callopistria dascia D. S. Fletcher, 1961
 Callopistria deflexusa Chang, 1991
 Callopistria delicata Chang, 1991
 Callopistria duplicans Walker, 1858
 Callopistria emiliusalis (Walker, [1859])
 Callopistria equatorialis Berio, 1970
 Callopistria exotica (Guenée, 1852)
 Callopistria ferruginea (Hampson, 1908)
 Callopistria fimbripes (Walker, 1858)
 Callopistria flabellum Berio, 1976
 Callopistria flavitincta Galsworthy, 1997
 Callopistria floridensis (Guenée, 1852)
 Callopistria fusimacula (Holloway, 1989)
 Callopistria gilvithorax (Prout, 1928)
 Callopistria granitosa (Guenée, 1852)
 Callopistria grassei Laporte, 1970
 Callopistria guttulalis Hampson, 1896
 Callopistria imparata (Walker, 1865)
 Callopistria indica (Butler, 1891)
 Callopistria insularis Butler, 1882
 Callopistria intermissa Saalmüller, 1891
 Callopistria jamaicensis (Möschler, 1886)
 Callopistria japonibia Inoue & Sugi, 1958
 Callopistria javentina (Stoll, 1782)
 Callopistria juventina (Stoll, [1782]) – Latin
 Callopistria latreillei (Duponchel, 1827)
 Callopistria leucobasis (Hampson, 1908)
 Callopistria ludovici (Prout, 1922)
 Callopistria maillardi (Guenée, 1862)
 Callopistria malagasy Viette, 1965
 Callopistria matilei Viette, 1979
 Callopistria microptera (Hampson, 1908)
 Callopistria minuata Butler, 1889
 Callopistria miranda (Saalmüller, 1880)
 Callopistria mollissima (Guenée, 1852)
 Callopistria montana Holloway, 1976
 Callopistria nana (Hampson, 1911)
 Callopistria natalensis (Hampson, 1908)
 Callopistria nigrescens (Wileman, 1915)
 Callopistria niveigutta (Walker, [1863])
 Callopistria nobilior Eda, 2000
 Callopistria pauliani Berio, 1955
 Callopistria pheogona Hampson, 1908 (or Callopistria phaeogona)
 Callopistria placodoides (Guenée, 1852)
 Callopistria promiscua Saalmüller, 1891
 Callopistria pulchrilinea (Walker, 1862)
 Callopistria quadralba (Draudt, 1950)
 Callopistria quadrinotata (Walker, [1863])
 Callopistria randimbyi Viette, 1965
 Callopistria rectilinea Saalmüller, 1891
 Callopistria repleta Walker, [1858]
 Callopistria renivitta Berio, 1966
 Callopistria rufulus (Rothschild, 1924)
 Callopistria rivularis Walker, [1858]
 Callopistria scriptiplena (Walker, 1862)
 Callopistria sogai Viette, 1965
 Callopistria subroseata Berio, 1966
 Callopistria tarsipilosa Berio, 1959
 Callopistria thalpophiloides (Walker, 1862)
 Callopistria thermochroa (Hampson, 1911)
 Callopistria trilineata (Walker, 1862)
 Callopistria unica Laporte, 1973
 Callopistria venata Leech, 1900
 Callopistria ventralis Walker, [1863]
 Callopistria violascens (Rothschild, 1924)
 Callopistria wallacei (Felder, 1874)
 Callopistria xerysta Viette, 1976
 Callopistria yerburii (Butler, 1884)

References

External links
 

Caradrinini
Noctuoidea genera